Lisičji Jarak Airport   is located 13 km north from the city of Belgrade, near Padinska Skela, Serbia. The airport is mostly used for pilot training and sport parachuting jumps, as well as crop dusting operations.

See also 
List of airports in Serbia

External links 
Lisičji Jarak airport information (PDF)

Airports in Serbia
Palilula, Belgrade